Banner Records was an American record company and label in the 1920s and 1930s. It was created primarily for the S.S. Kresge Company, though it was employed as a budget label in other discount stores.

History
Banner was formed in January 1922 as the flagship label of the Plaza Music Company of New York City. Plaza Music produced several cheap labels targeted at discount houses and hired bandleader Adrian Schubert as musical director. At the beginning, Banner concentrated on popular dance hits, though it also recorded comedy, semi-classical music, and a small number of country and blues records. In its first years Banner also leased masters from Paramount Records and Emerson Records.

In July 1929 Plaza merged with Cameo-Pathé and the Scranton Button Company to form the (ARC). ARC dropped Pathé and Scranton Button's label Emerson but kept active all of the other labels belonging to the combined company, including Banner. After ARC acquired the rights to Brunswick Records, Banner's product lines began to reflect the general ARC product, and this added more African-American and country music to its catalogue. As part of the ARC-BRC combination, it no longer enjoyed a flagship status accorded to Melotone among the budget labels. Although ARC-BRC dropped some of the dime-store labels, it kept Banner until December 1938, when the CBS Broadcasting Network bought ARC-BRC and liquidated all of the dime-store labels.

In December 1946, entrepreneur Sam Selsman formed a new Banner Records label, devoted to Jewish music and Yiddish-language comedy routines; although this later Banner Records no longer actively records, its catalogue continues. There is no relationship between the Hebrew Banner label and the earlier products of Plaza Music or ARC/BRC; nor is there is a relationship to a dime-store label put out by Leeds and Caitlin in the early 1900s, though the label's design is similar.

Label Series
Banner debuted with two concurrent label series in January 1922: a popular 1000 series side by side with a "Standard" 2000 series of semi-classical music, comedy, and some Jewish material. Reaching Banner 1999 in the main series in mid-1927, Banner skipped ahead to 6000 and terminated the Standard series at the end of the year at Banner 2183. At this point, Banner also stopped the 6000 series at Banner 6167 and moved again to a 7000 series starting at Banner 7001. This ended in early 1929 at Banner 7265 and the reverted to the old series, starting at Banner 6200. The series survived the merger into ARC, but was ended at the start of 1930 at Banner 6566 and restarted at 0500 until it reached 0872 later in the year. The number series was then started again at 32001 and the price changed from 25 cents to 35 cents in order to bring Banner in line with other dime-store labels being sold 3 for a dollar. This lasted until 1935, when the dime-store labels were all married to a central numbering system. But releases were not necessarily unified; for example, Robert Johnson, who did have some releases on Melotone, did not appear on Banner.

Legacy
Banner discs are found throughout the United States, indicating their popularity as Plaza's flagship label. The audio fidelity of the records was average to slightly below average for the time, but as Banner was a cheap label they were pressed from cheaper materials that did not withstand repeated playing with the heavy phonograph players of the time. Most Banner discs found today exhibit considerable wear and surface noise, but they are still valued by virtue of the selections.

In keeping with their low-price production, it is common for a current hit song on the A-side and a lesser-known song as the B side.  Many of these B side songs are eccentric tunes not recorded elsewhere (but, of course, found on the other Plaza/ARC labels).  Many of these odd songs have great hot solos, making them quite enjoyable.  Also scattered around these B sides are hot tunes by Luis Russell, Duke Ellington, small groups from the Ben Pollack orchestra, among others.

Roster: Plaza period

 Harold Arlen
 Sam Ash
 Franklyn Baur
 Al Bernard
 May Singhi Breen
 California Ramblers
 Joe Candullo
 Myron Cohen
 Vernon Dalhart
 Vaughn DeLeath
 Cliff Edwards
 Leo Erdody
 Frank Ferera
 Arthur Fields
 The Four Aristocrats
 Miss Frankie
 Bob Fuller
 Rev. J. M. Gates
 Nathan Glantz
 Porter Grainger
 Lou Gold
 Billy Golden via Emerson Records
 Wendell Hall
 W.C. Handy
 Charles W. Harrison
 Charles Hart
 Lucille Hegamin
 Fletcher Henderson
 Rosa Henderson
 Billy Jones & Ernie Hare
 Joe Jordan
 Irving Kaufman
 Jack Kaufman
 Louis Katzman
 Hal Kemp
 Sam Lanin
 Scrappy Lambert
 Julius Lenzberg
 Jules Levy, Jr.
 Vincent Lopez
 Frank Luther
 Hazel Meyers
 Josie Miles
 Lizzie Miles
 Frank Munn
 Billy Murray
 Original Indiana Five
 Original Memphis Five
 Eddie Peabody
 Jack Pettis
 Evelyn Preer
 The Radio Franks
 Harry Richman
 Carson Robison
 Walter B. Rogers
 Peter DeRose
 Domenico Savino
 Adrian Schubert
 Ben Selvin
 Boyd Senter
 Elliott Shaw
 Monroe Silver
 Paul Specht
 Elizabeth Spencer
 Aileen Stanley
 Cal Stewart via Emerson Records
 Ernest Stoneman
 Toots Paka Hawaiian Troupe
 Fred Van Eps
 Sam Ku West
 Harry Yerkes

Roster: ARC period
Although some of the artists from the previous incarnation of Banner survived into this second period, particularly in 1929-1931, none of these artists appeared on the first label.

 Henry "Red" Allen
 Clarence Ashley
 Gene Austin
 Gene Autry
 Baby Rose Marie
 Smith Ballew
 Charlie Barnet
 Lucille Bogan
 Big Bill Broonzy
 Smiley Burnette
 Chick Bullock
 Henry Busse
 Blanche Calloway
 Cab Calloway
 The Canova Family
 Eddie Cantor
 Bill Carlisle
 Cliff Carlisle
 Carter Family
 Sam Collins
 Bill Cox
 Bing Crosby
 Charlie Davis
 Walter Davis
 Eddie Dean
 Georgia Tom Dorsey
 Morton Downey, Sr.
 Duke Ellington
 Ruth Etting
 Alice Faye
 Red Foley
 George Hamilton Green
 Joe Green
 Mal Hallett
 Mike Hanapi
 Annette Hanshaw
 Joe Haymes
 Hokum Boys
 Hoosier Hot Shots
 Frankie "Half Pint" Jaxon
 Gene Kardos
 Ed Kirkeby
 Lead Belly
 Guy Lombardo
 Nick Lucas
 Charles Magnante
 Wingy Manone
 Frankie Marvin
 Johnny Marvin
 Memphis Minnie
 Mills Blue Rhythm Band
 Mills Brothers
 Mitchell Christian Singers
 Russ Morgan
 Buddy Moss
 Will Osborne
 Ben Pollack
 Dick Powell
 Prairie Ramblers
 Yank Rachell
 Joe Reichman
 Harry Reser
 Fred Rich
 Tex Ritter
 Fiddlin' Doc Roberts
 Dick Robertson
 Adrian Rollini
 Luis Russell
 Andy Sanella
 Singin' Sam
 Roy Smeck
 Phil Spitalny
 Eva Taylor
 Varsity Eight
 Joe Venuti
 Don Voorhees
 Jay Wilbur
 Josh White
 Clarence Williams
 Victor Young

See also
 List of record labels
 ARC (record company)

References

External links
Roger Misiewicz & Helge Thygesen -- Melotone Mythology: Robert Johnson's Dime Store Issues
Bille W. Thomas & Allen Sutton -- The Plaza-ARC Discography
The Stone Collection -- 78s The Labels Banner
Jewish Virtual Library -- Records, Phonograph
Banner Records on the Internet Archive's Great 78 Project

American record labels
Jazz record labels
Record labels established in 1922
Record labels disestablished in 1938
Defunct record labels of the United States